The Mixed 49er was a sailing event on the Sailing at the 2004 Summer Olympics program in Agios Kosmas Olympic Sailing Centre. sixteen races were scheduled and completed with two discards. 38 sailors, on 19 boats, from 19 nation competed.

Race schedule

Course area and course configuration

Weather conditions

Final results

Daily standings

Further reading

References 

Open 49er
49er (dinghy)
Unisex sailing at the Summer Olympics